Men's handball at the 2015 Summer Universiade was held in Gwangju, South Korea from 6 to 13 July 2015.

Teams

Teams

Pool A

 (represented by United States Air Force Academy)

Pool B

Results
All times are Korea Standard Time (UTC+09:00)

Preliminary round

Group A

Group B

11th place match

9th place match

7th place match

5th place match

Bronze-medal match

Gold-medal match

Final Standings and Statistics

Top Scorers

Top Goalkeepers

External links
Official website

2015 Summer Universiade events
Handball at the Summer Universiade
2015 in handball